Panfuturism (also known as Kverofuturism) is a Ukrainian avant-garde art movement developed by Mykhaylo Semenko, a Ukrainian poet.

Overview

History 
Panfuturism originated in Ukraine. Mykhaylo Semenko developed it in 1914.

Principles 
Semenko outlined the following principles of Panfuturism in an essay, "What Panfuturism wants": 
 Panfuturism "wants to be a scientific system which is attained by its being a system universal and synthetic."
 The goal of Panfuturism is to "abolish all 'isms' which is attained by neutralizing them...by regarding every single case as a private problem of the polyproblematic organism of art."
 Panfuturism is a "proletarian system of art."
 Panfuturism is an "organizational art."
 Panfuturism "is the whole art."
 Panfuturism "is at once Futurism, Cubism, Expressionism and Dadaism."

References 

 01
Ukrainian art movements
Futurism
Ukrainian avant-garde